The Liverpool City Region Combined Authority (LCRCA) is the combined authority of the Liverpool City Region. The Liverpool City Region includes the City of Liverpool local authority area plus the Metropolitan Boroughs of Knowsley, St Helens, Sefton, Wirral and the Borough of Halton in North West England. It was established on 1 April 2014 by statutory instrument under the provisions of the Local Democracy, Economic Development and Construction Act 2009. Membership of the combined authority is made up of the leaders of the six principal membership authorities and the local enterprise partnership.

The LCRCA is a strategic authority with powers over transport, economic development and regeneration. Transport policy of the combined authority is delivered by the Merseytravel functional body.

The chair of the authority is Steve Rotheram, the Liverpool City Region Mayor.

History

Development and formation
In order to create a combined authority the local authorities in the proposed combined area must undertake a governance review and produce a scheme of their proposals. The Liverpool City Region Local Enterprise Partnership also supported them.

The governance review explored four options for the strategic governance of Liverpool City Region. They were status quo/do nothing; a supervisory board; an economic prosperity board; or a combined authority. It concluded that the establishment of a combined authority would improve the "alignment, coordination and delivery of economic development and transport related initiatives" and "the decision making process will become faster and more efficient".

The scheme was published on 30 September 2013. It proposed a combined authority comprising seven members - one from each constituent local authority, and one more from Liverpool City Region Local Enterprise Partnership. The combined authority, specifically through its transport committee, replaces the Merseyside Integrated Transport Authority. The Merseyside Passenger Transport Executive remains as the transport executive organisation and is formally named Merseytravel.

Naming
The proposed authority was known as the Liverpool City Region Combined Authority throughout the development process and was the name submitted to the Department for Communities and Local Government. However, the government published scheme used the name 'Greater Merseyside Combined Authority'. The government consultation that followed showed strong support for a name that included 'Liverpool' and not 'Merseyside'. The name was changed to Halton, Knowsley, Liverpool, St Helens, Sefton and Wirral Combined Authority in the draft order presented to parliament. This was chosen by the Department for Communities and Local Government (DCLG) because it said the local authorities could not agree a name for the combined authority and some responses to the consultation objected to the name 'Liverpool'. An explanatory memorandum attached to the orders creating the combined authorities stated that any name including 'City Region' was considered "misleading and inappropriate" by the government. DCLG stated that the combined authority could use any public name it wanted. On 21 February 2014 it was decided by the constituent councils that the authority will use the public name of Liverpool City Region Combined Authority. A motion at the inaugural meeting on 1 April 2014 proposed that the authority should adopt the name Liverpool City Region Combined Authority and this was passed unanimously.

Background
In 2020 the Combined Authority ran a consultation program called "LCR Listens: Our Places", which gained the views of people in the city region who don't typically participate in spatial development consultations. Their work won a Planning Award 2020 for 'stakeholder engagement in planning (plan-making)'.

Across September and November 2020 the combined authority started a land commission- reported as the first of its kind in England- to re-orientate the city-region's economy around community wealth building. This was in partnership with Centre for Local Economic Strategies.

Membership

The membership of the combined authority is as follows:

Leadership
Joe Anderson was appointed chair on 18 December 2015 after the resignation of Phil Davies. Barrie Grunewald was appointed deputy chair on 19 June 2015.

Leadership dispute
The long-term future of the new authority was left in doubt after Joe Anderson decided to seek legal advice on Liverpool City Council leaving, following his failure to be elected as its chair. Anderson was not present during the leadership vote. Other members said he allowed his personal ego and his belief he had a "God given right to chair the authority" to put it in jeopardy. The future of the authority appeared more secure following a statement by Anderson on 7 April 2014, where he made clear that the matter that caused the dispute is "closed" and that Liverpool would remain in the combined authority.

The authority held its first elections for a directly elected mayor in May 2017. The election was won by Steve Rotheram.

Committees
The authority consists of several committees. Other than the Merseytravel Committee on transport matters which is detailed in the constitution and the Authority itself it is also has an Audit Committee and a Scrutiny Panel.

Merseytravel Committee
The Merseytravel Committee acts as the transport authority, with Merseytravel as the executive agency.

External links
Liverpool City Region Combined Authority (Official website)
Liverpool City Region Local Enterprise Partnership
Meetings and Agendas

References

Combined authorities
Local government in Merseyside
Liverpool City Region